Peter Gould (18 November 1932 – 22 January 2000) was an Evan Pugh Professor Emeritus of Geography at Penn State University. Throughout his tenure at Penn State University, Gould received many awards including the Lauréat Prix International de Géographie Vautrin Lud, the Retzius Gold Metal of the Swedish Society for Anthropology and Geography, as well as an honorary Doctor of Science from the Universitaire de Strasbourg. Dr. Gould was a main contributor to the quantitative revolution in the field of Geography.

History 
Born in 1932 in Coulsdon, Surrey, Peter Gould decided he was going to become a geographer at a fairly young age. He graduated from Colgate University in 1956 with a BA (summa cum laude, Phi Beta Kappa).  He attended Northwestern University for both his MA, and PhD.

Legacy 
Professor Gould is still well known for his work with spatial analysis, and mental maps. His research on dynamic structures of geographic space and on television in particular constitute early building blocks for researching the geography of media and communication. The Peter R. Gould Center for Geography Education and Outreach within the Department of Geography at the Pennsylvania State University was named in his honor.  Colgate University's Geography Department gives a Peter Gould Award in Geography annually.

Bibliography

References 

1932 births
2000 deaths
American geographers
Pennsylvania State University faculty
People from Coulsdon
Recipients of the Vautrin Lud International Geography Prize
Colgate University alumni
Northwestern University alumni
20th-century geographers